Zinaida Greceanîi Cabinet can refer to: 

 First Greceanîi Cabinet
 Second Greceanîi Cabinet